The following state routes in Virginia have been numbered 275:
Virginia State Route 275 (1933-1940), now part of SR 259
Virginia State Route 275 (1941-1954), now SR 671 in Loudoun County
Virginia State Route 275 (pre-2006), now part of SR 262